Zobellia galactanivorans is a gram-negative marine bacterium isolated from the surface of red algae of the coast of France. Z. galactanivorans forms yellow colonies with a bacillus or diplobacillus morphology. Furthermore, it is mesophilic and can grow degrade carrageenans and agars - both found in the cell wall of red algae. Z. galactanivorans contains the gene porB which encodes the enzyme β-porphyranase-B.

Function of β-porphyranase-B 
β-porphyranase-B is a catalytic enzyme that hydrolyzes the β-D-galactopyranose (1→4) α-L-galactopyranose-6-sulfate linkage in porphyran.

Comparison of β-Porphyranase-B and β-Porphyranase-A 
There is a 35% sequence similarity between β-Porphyranase-B and β-Porphyranase-A.  Furthermore, orthologs between Z. galactanivorans and Bacteroides plebeius-1698, a strain of Bacteroides plebeius, contain a sequence similarity of 48%-69%. Homologous genes between other Bacteroides  species only have a 30% sequence similarity. Moreover, porphyranase genes in both Z. galactanivorans and B. plebeius are located in similar orders along their chromosome, or are syntenic.

References

External links
Type strain of Zobellia galactanivorans at BacDive -  the Bacterial Diversity Metadatabase

Flavobacteria
Gut flora bacteria
Bacteria described in 2005